Łukasz Simlat (born 11 December 1977) is a Polish actor. He has appeared in more than 60 films and television shows since 2000.

Biography 
Graduate of the Secondary School named after Emilia Plater in Sosnowiec. For two years he attended the acting studio "Art-Play" by Dorota Pomykała and Danuta Owczarek in Katowice. In 2000, he graduated from the Theater Academy in Warsaw (without a diploma).

After graduation, he made guest appearances in several theaters without a permanent job. Since December 3, 2007, he has been a full-time actor at the Powszechny Theater in Warsaw. In 2012, thanks to Agnieszka Glińska, he became a member of the artistic team of the Studio Theater in Warsaw.

His theatrical achievements have been appreciated and awarded many times.

He is married.

Selected filmography
 Vinci (2004)
 Courage (2011)
 In the Name Of (2013)
 Karbala (2015)
 Fugue (2018)
 Corpus Christi (2019)

References

External links

1977 births
Living people
Polish film actors
Polish male film actors
20th-century Polish male actors
21st-century Polish male actors
Aleksander Zelwerowicz National Academy of Dramatic Art in Warsaw alumni
People from Sosnowiec
Polish male stage actors